Ben Shelton may refer to:

 Ben Shelton (baseball) (born 1969), former professional baseball player
 Ben Shelton (tennis) (born 2002), professional tennis player